Lisa Lubasch is an American poet.

Life
Lubasch received her BA in English from Yale University, an MA in Writing from Johns Hopkins University, and an MFA in Poetry from the Iowa Writers’ Workshop.

She is the author of five collections of poetry, including So I Began, Twenty-One After Days, To Tell the Lamp, and How Many More of Them Are You? which received the Norma Farber First Book Award from the Poetry Society of America. Selections from How Many More of Them Are You? were translated into French in 2002 and appear as a chapbook in Un bureau sur l'Atlantique's Format Américain series.

She has been an editor of Double Change, a French-American poetry web journal.

Lubasch lives in New York City. She coedits the press Solid Objects, out of Brooklyn, NY.

Awards
 2000 Norma Farber First Book Award, How Many More of Them Are You?
 2005-2006 The Gertrude Stein Awards, Twenty-One After Days

Works

Poetry Books

Translation

References

External links
Brooklyn Rail Interview Max Winter and Lisa Lubasch with Megan Gillin

1973 births
Living people
American women poets
21st-century American women
Yale University alumni
Johns Hopkins University alumni
Iowa Writers' Workshop alumni